James Garbutt (12 September 1925 – 6 April 2020) was a British actor who was active on television from the 1960s.

Born in Houghton-le-Spring, County Durham in 1925, James was an RAF pilot and was trained in the United States and stationed in Africa during the second world war.

After the war he then became an Art Teacher during this time, and he became a key member of the People's Theatre, Newcastle upon Tyne, during the 1950s and 1960s.

His credits include: The Troubleshooters, The Borderers, Z-Cars, The Onedin Line, Warship, Doctor Who (in the serial Genesis of the Daleks), Bill Brand, When the Boat Comes In, Juliet Bravo, One by One, All Creatures Great and Small, Soldier Soldier (TV series) 'Band of Gold' episode (which features Robson & Jerome singing in an impromptu wedding band), Boon, Between the Lines and Casualty.

He died in April 2020 at the age of 94.

Filmography

References

External links
 

1925 births
2020 deaths
English male television actors
People from Houghton-le-Spring
Male actors from Tyne and Wear